Fernand Djoumessi Temfack (born 5 September 1989) is a Cameroonian high jumper.

He won the bronze medal at the 2010 African Championships, finished fourth at the 2011 All-Africa Games, fourth at the 2013 Jeux de la Francophonie, seventh at the 2014 Commonwealth Games, won the silver medal at the 2014 African Championships, and finished seventh at the 2014 Continental Cup.

His personal best is 2.28 metres, achieved in June 2014 in Bühl.

References

External links
 
 

1989 births
Living people
Cameroonian male high jumpers
Commonwealth Games competitors for Cameroon
Athletes (track and field) at the 2014 Commonwealth Games
Athletes (track and field) at the 2011 All-Africa Games
African Games competitors for Cameroon
20th-century Cameroonian people
21st-century Cameroonian people